Kazakhstan–Mongolia relations refers to bilateral relations between Mongolia and Kazakhstan. Mongolia established diplomatic relations with the Republic of Kazakhstan on January 22, 1992.

The Embassy of Mongolia to Kazakhstan, Almaty opened in September 1992 and began operating in Astana in 2010. The diplomatic mission of Kazakhstan to Mongolia opened in 1992 in Ulaanbaatar. The mission was upgraded to an Embassy on January 1, 2007.



Political cooperation 
In October 1993, Kazakhstan's President Nursultan Nazarbayev paid his first official visit to Mongolia. The Protocol on Cooperation between Khural of Mongolia and Mazhilis of Kazakhstan was signed in 2003. The first official visit of Mongolian President Natsagyn Bagabandi to Kazakhstan occurred in 1998. Nazarbayev was awarded the highest honor of Mongolia, the Order of "Erdene Ochir" ("The Precious Rod"), for his contribution to the development of bilateral relations during his official visit to Mongolia in the summer of 2008. Since the establishment of diplomatic relations in 1991, the two countries have signed more than 50 bilateral treaties and agreements.

In October 2019, Mongolian Prime Minister Ukhnaagiin Khürelsükh visited Nur-Sultan and met Kazakh Prime Minister Askar Mamin. It was the first visit by a Mongolian Prime Minister in 25 years.

In October 2021, Minister of Foreign Affairs of Mongolia Batmunkh Battsetseg visited Nur-Sultan and met Kazakh President Kassym-Jomart Tokayev.

Trade and economic cooperation 
Kazakhstan-Mongolian Intergovernmental Commission (IGC) on Trade, Economic, Scientific, Technological and Cultural cooperation was  established to strengthen bilateral cooperation. Trade turnover in 2017 reached US$68.2 million, according to the Ministry of Finance of the Republic of Kazakhstan.

The main export goods from Kazakhstan to Mongolia are tobacco, cigarettes, sanitary and hygiene products, wheat and wheat-rye flour and oil.

The main import good of Mongolia to Kazakhstan: products of animal and vegetable origin, textiles and textile products, wood, timber, pulp, and paper.

Cultural and humanitarian cooperation 

Some 10 agreements have been signed between Mongolia and Kazakhstan. Programs include exchange students program and in 2001, the East Kazakhstan State opened its branch in the  city of Ulaanbaatar. 25 grants were awarded annually to citizens of Mongolia. The Kazakhstan government provided humanitarian aid of US$200,000 to the victims of the mud flow that happened on July 10, 2016.

See also 
 Kazakh-Dzungar Wars
 Foreign relations of Kazakhstan
 Foreign relations of Mongolia

References 

Bilateral relations of Mongolia
Bilateral relations of Kazakhstan